La Noche de Walpurgis /Walpurgis Night (released in the United States as The Werewolf vs. The Vampire Woman, in the UK as Shadow of the Werewolf, and in Canada as Werewolf Shadow), is a 1970 Spanish/German horror film starring Paul Naschy, the fifth in his series about the werewolf Waldemar Daninsky.  This film was directed by León Klimovsky and written by Paul Naschy, and is generally regarded to have kickstarted the Spanish horror film boom of the 1970s (as well as Naschy's career), due to its awesome box office success upon its release. This was Naschy's all-time most financially successful film. It was also the first of 8 films that he would make with director Leon Klimovsky at the helm.

The Munich-based production partner responsible for making the film was named Hi-fi Stereo 70 KG, who were also responsible for Michael Armstrong's Mark of the Devil. Thus, it has long been mistakenly believed that it was produced in 70mm and stereo sound; it was in fact shot in standard spherical 35mm with monophonic sound. The German distributors added the name "Hans Munkel" to the screenwriting credit in some versions in order to satisfy the terms of international co-production. Carlos Aured was Klimovsky's assistant director on the film, and his meeting with Naschy led to his going on later to direct four other films for Naschy.

Walpurgis Night was shot in November 1970. It was first released theatrically in Spain on May 17, 1971, in Germany on October 6, 1971 and in the U.K. in October 1972.  It was later released theatrically in the U.S. in 1972 as The Werewolf vs. the Vampire Woman (accompanied by a lurid movie tie-in paperback novelization (written by "Arthur N. Scarm") that did not precisely follow the movie). In Canada, the film (retitled Werewolf Shadow) played on a double bill with Jesus Franco's 1971 Dracula Vs Frankenstein.

Klimovsky filmed many of the scenes in slow motion, to add to the film's otherworldliness, as Naschy's script instructed him. There is a scene in this film that obviously inspired Spanish director Amando de Ossorio to write Tombs of the Blind Dead, which was made just a few months later in 1971. A skeletal zombie in a monk's garments assaults Naschy in a cemetery in one scene, bearing a strong resemblance to de Ossorio's Templar Knights in his "Blind Dead" films.

Naschy followed up this film with a sequel entitled Dr. Jekyll y el Hombre Lobo.

Plot 
Following the events in The Fury of the Wolf Man, the deceased lycanthrope Waldemar Daninsky is revived to life when two country doctors surgically remove two silver bullets from his heart while performing an autopsy on him. Waldemar transforms into a werewolf, kills the doctors and escapes from the morgue. Some time later, two students, Elvira (named after Naschy's real-life wife of 40 years) and her friend Genevieve, go searching for the tomb of medieval murderess Countess Wandessa Darvula de Nadasdy. They find a possible gravesite in the vicinity of Waldemar Daninsky's castle, and the handsome count invites the girls to stay for a few days while they investigate the site.

When Waldemar helps them to uncover the grave of Countess Wandessa, Elvira accidentally revives the vampire by bleeding onto her corpse. The vampire woman turns several young women including Genevieve into creatures of the night like herself, and they roam the forest at night, killing people in eerie slow motion. Daninsky later turns into the Wolf Man, is forced to battle and destroy the vampire countess at the end of the film, after which he is killed by Elvira, a woman who loves him enough to end his torment. She plunges a silver cross into Waldemar's chest.

Cast 
 Paul Naschy as Waldemar Daninsky
 Gaby Fuchs as Elvira
 Patty Shepard as Countess Wandesa Dárvula de Nadasdy
 Barbara Capell as Genevieve Bennett
 Yelena Samarina as Elizabeth Daninsky
 Andrés Resino as Inspector Marcel
 José Marco as Pierre
 Betsabé Ruiz as Pierre's girlfriend 
 Barta Barri as Muller
 Luis Gaspar as Distraught man
 Julio Peña as Dr. Hartwig
 Eduardo Chappa 2 roles as Tramp / Monster
 María Luisa Tovar as First Female Victim
 Patricia Comptell
 Annie Filsy
 Jenny Tompson

Production 
La Noche de Walpurgis was the fifth entry in a series of films to feature the werewolf Waldemar Daninsky. Daninsky's lycanthropy is not given a specific origin in this film; the events of the film are assumed to have followed from the ending of Fury of the Wolf Man (1970), which involved a Yeti's bite as the cause of Daninsky's curse. How Daninsky went from being a college professor in Fury to being a castle-owning count in Walpurgis is never addressed. Some critics feel the film works better if one assumes it to be a direct sequel to Naschy's first werewolf film, La Marca del Hombre Lobo (1968).

Release
The film was released theatrically in its native Spain as La Noche de Walpurgis in May 1971, and was released theatrically in the United States as The Werewolf vs the Vampire Woman by Ellman Film Enterprises in 1972, accompanied by a paperback novelization tie-in (which didn't really follow the plot of the film too closely). It was shown in England as Shadow of the Werewolf, in Belgium as Night of the Loup Garous, and in Germany in October 1971 as Die Nacht der Vampire/ Night of the Vampire. It was re-released theatrically years later in Germany as Nacht der Blutigen Hexen/ Night of the Bloody Witches. It was shown in Italy as La Messe Nere della Contessa Dracula/ The Black Mass of Countess Dracula, and in France as La Furie des Vampires.

Home media 
The film was released on VHS in the 1980s as both Blood Moon and as The Werewolf vs the Vampire Woman, and was later released on a special edition DVD in 2007 by Deimos Entertainment, a subdivision of BCI Eclipse, as Werewolf Shadow (sic) with extras. It has also been released as a German Blu-Ray from Subkultur under the title Die Nacht der Vampire.

Alternate Release Titles
 La Noche de Walpurgis (Spain/ Mexico)
 Die Nacht der Vampire (Germany)
 The Werewolf vs the Vampire Woman (U.S.)
 Shadow of the Werewolf (U.K.)
 Werewolf's Shadow (Canada)
 Le messe nere della contessa Dracula (Italy)
 La Furie des Vampires (France)
 Le Nuit des Loup Garous (Belgium)

See also
 Holiday horror

References

External links 
 

1971 films
1971 horror films
Spanish vampire films
West German films
1970s Spanish-language films
Films directed by León Klimovsky
German vampire films
Spanish werewolf films
Films shot in Madrid
Films scored by Antón García Abril
Walpurgis Night fiction
Waldemar Daninsky series
1970s German films
1970s Spanish films